The Golden Web is a lost 1926 American silent mystery film directed by Walter Lang and starring Lillian Rich, Huntley Gordon and Lawford Davidson. The cast also features Boris Karloff before he established himself as a horror star. It is based on the 1910 novel The Golden Web by the British writer E. Phillips Oppenheim. A previous British film adaptation of the novel was produced in 1920.

Cast
 Lillian Rich as Ruth Rowan
 Huntley Gordon as Roland Deane
 Jay Hunt as John Rowan
 Lawford Davidson as George Sisk
 Boris Karloff as Dave Sinclair
 Nora Hayden as Miss Philbury
 Syd Crossley as Butler
 Joe Moore as Office Boy

See also
 List of lost films
 Boris Karloff filmography

References

Bibliography
 Connelly, Robert B. The Silents: Silent Feature Films, 1910-36, Volume 40, Issue 2. December Press, 1998.
 Langman, Larry. American Film Cycles: The Silent Era. Greenwood Publishing, 1998.
 Munden, Kenneth White. The American Film Institute Catalog of Motion Pictures Produced in the United States, Part 1. University of California Press, 1997.
Wlaschin, Ken. Silent Mystery and Detective Movies: A Comprehensive Filmography. McFarland, 2009.

External links

1926 films
1926 drama films
1926 mystery films
American mystery drama films
American silent feature films
American black-and-white films
1920s mystery drama films
Films directed by Walter Lang
Gotham Pictures films
Lost American films
Films based on British novels
1920s American films
Silent American drama films
Silent mystery drama films
Lost mystery drama films
1920s English-language films